Wu Chengru (born 15 September 2000) is a Chinese footballer currently playing as a midfielder for Guangzhou R&F.

Club career
Wu Chengru would play for the Guangzhou R&F youth team and was promoted to the senior team at the beginning of the 2020 league season where he made his debut on 29 August 2020 against Shenzhen F.C. in a 2-0 defeat.

Career statistics

References

External links 

2000 births
Living people
Chinese footballers
Association football midfielders
Chinese Super League players
Guangzhou City F.C. players